Barringtonia ashtonii is a tree in the family Lecythidaceae.

Description
The bark is brown.

Distribution and habitat
Barringtonia ashtonii is endemic to Borneo. Its habitat is riverine mixed dipterocarp forests.

References

ashtonii
Plants described in 1968
Endemic flora of Borneo
Trees of Borneo
Flora of the Borneo lowland rain forests